Maya Martine Els Weug (born 1 June 2004) is a Dutch-Belgian-Spanish female racing driver, currently competing in the Italian F4 Championship for Iron Lynx. She is a member of the Ferrari Driver Academy and the first female driver to have ever joined the academy.

Career

Karting 
Weug started karting when she was seven years old. She has competed in multiple national championships, such as the Spanish Karting Championship, where she finished second in the Alevin Class in 2015. 2016 was Weug's first year on the international karting stage, where she would immediately show her talent, winning the WSK Final Cup in the 60 Mini category, where she beat fellow future academy member Dino Beganovic. In the next four years the Dutch racer continued to compete on the international karting stage, making appearances in both the CIK-FIA Karting European Championship and Karting World Championship; her best result in the former ended up being a 17th place in 2020.

Lower formulae

2021 

In 2021 Weug made her debut in Italian F4 for Iron Lynx Motorsport Lab as part of their Iron Dames program in association with her FDA-membership. Driving alongside the Italian pairing of Leonardo Fornaroli and Pietro Armanni, Weug would score three rookie podiums, one each at Le Castellet, Misano and Vallelunga, however she would miss out on scoring any points in the main championship, thus ending up 35th in the standings. In an interview, Weug stated that "[they] were so close so many times [to score points]", and said that her lack of experience hindered her throughout the season.

2022 

For the 2022 season the Dutch driver would remain with Iron Dames, partnering Ivan Domingues. A mixed-weather qualifying session in the opening round at the Imola Circuit enabled Weug to start third in both races on Sunday, and after scoring her first point in Race 1 she would finish sixth on Sunday. At the following round in Misano, Weug continued this run of form by scoring yet more points, and despite a heavy collision at the end of Race 3 she would be classified eighth due to the countback rule. The Belgian took a tenth place from the next meeting at Spa-Francorchamps, before yet another top-ten finish at Vallelunga. Having scored points in three more races during the remainder of the season, Weug was placed 14th in the championship, one place ahead of teammate Domingues.

Formula Regional 
Having taken part in several post-season tests with KIC Motorsport, Weug would progress to the Formula Regional European Championship, driving for the Finnish outfit.

FIA Formula 3 
Weug was selected to take part in a one-day FIA Formula 3 test at Magny-Cours in November 2021, alongside fellow Iron Dames racer Doriane Pin and W Series drivers Nerea Martí and Irina Sidorkova.

Formula One 
In October 2020 Weug was nominated as one of twenty female drivers of ages between 12 and 16 to compete in the "Girls on Track - Rising Stars" programme organized by the FIA Women in Motorsport Commission, with the reward for the victor of the shootout being a place in the Ferrari Driver Academy. Weug made it into the final selection stage alongside Doriane Pin, Julia Ayoub and Antonella Bassani, and on 22 January it was announced that she had won the shootout and would be joining the FDA.

Personal life 
Weug was born in Costa Blanca, Spain to a Dutch father and a Belgian mother. She has competed under the flags of all three nations across her career.

Karting record

Karting career summary 

† As Weug was a guest driver, she was ineligible to score points.

Complete Karting World Championship results

Racing record

Racing career summary 

† As Weug was a guest driver, she was ineligible for championship points.

Complete Italian F4 Championship results 
(key) (Races in bold indicate pole position) (Races in italics indicate fastest lap)

Complete ADAC Formula 4 Championship results 
(key) (Races in bold indicate pole position) (Races in italics indicate fastest lap)

† As Weug was a guest driver, she was ineligible for championship points.

Complete Formula Regional European Championship results 
(key) (Races in bold indicate pole position) (Races in italics indicate fastest lap)

References

External links 
 
 Maya Weug on Ferrari.com

2004 births
Living people
Ferrari people
Italian F4 Championship drivers
Dutch racing drivers
Dutch people of Spanish descent
Dutch people of Belgian descent
ADAC Formula 4 drivers
Karting World Championship drivers
Formula Regional European Championship drivers
KIC Motorsport drivers
Iron Lynx drivers
Dutch female racing drivers
Belgian racing drivers
Spanish female racing drivers
Belgian female racing drivers